Executive Order 14059, officially titled Imposing Sanctions on Foreign Persons Involved in the Global Illicit Drug Trade, was signed on December 15, 2021, and is the 75th executive order signed by U.S. President Joe Biden. The telos of the order is to enforce sanctions upon foreigners involved in global illicit drug trade.

Provisions 
Illicit drug trafficking into the United States, including fentanyl and other synthetic opioids, kills tens of thousands of Americans each year, as well as countless more non-fatal overdoses that have their own devastating toll on human life. The principal suppliers of illegal narcotics and precursor chemicals that drive the present opioid crisis, as well as drug-related violence that harms communities, are drug cartels, transnational criminal organizations, and their facilitators. International drug trafficking poses an unusual and extraordinary threat to the United States' national security, foreign policy, and economy. Because of this grave threat, the United States must modernize and update its drug-trafficking response.

Effects 
Section 1. The Secretary of the Treasury, in conjunction with the Secretary of State, the Attorney General, and the Secretary of Homeland Security, is authorized to impose any of the sanctions listed in section 2 of this order on any foreign person designated by the Secretary of the Treasury.
Sec. 2. When the Secretary of the Treasury, in consultation with the Secretary of State, the Attorney General, and the Secretary of Homeland Security, determines that a foreign person meets any of the criteria in section 1(a)–(c) of this order, the Secretary of the Treasury is authorized to choose one or more of the sanctions listed in subsections (a)(i)–(vi) of this section to impose on that foreign person.
Sec. 3. Except as otherwise allowed by legislation, regulations, orders, directions, or licenses issued pursuant to this order, and despite any contract entered into or license or permission given prior to the date of this order, the restrictions in section 2 of this order apply.
Sec. 4. The entry of undocumented migrants who meet any of the criteria in section l(a)–(c) of this order, and for whom the sanctions described in section 2(a)(i) or 2(b)(iii) of this order have been selected, would be detrimental to the interests of the United States, and entry of such persons into the United States, as immigrants or nonimmigrants, is hereby suspended, except when the Secretary of State or the Attorney General.
Sec. 5. Making any contribution or providing any funds, goods, or services to, or for the benefit of, any person whose property and interests in property are blocked pursuant to this order; and receiving any contribution or provision of funds, goods, or services from any such person are among the prohibitions.
Sec. 6. Any transaction that evades, has the intent to dodge or avoid, violates, or seeks to violate any of the restrictions outlined in this order is forbidden.

See also 
 List of executive actions by Joe Biden
2020 United States census

References

External links 
 US Presidential Actions
 Federal Register
Executive Order on Ensuring a Lawful and Accurate Enumeration and Apportionment Pursuant to the Decennial Census

2021 in American law
Executive orders of Joe Biden
January 2021 events in the United States